Eugene White was an American baseball third baseman in the Negro leagues.  He played with the Brooklyn Eagles in 1935.

References

External links
 and Seamheads

Brooklyn Eagles players
Year of birth missing
Year of death missing
Baseball third basemen